The 1923 municipal election was held December 10, 1923 to elect a mayor and six aldermen to sit on Edmonton City Council and four trustees to sit on the public school board. Robert Crossland, Paul Jenvrin, Thomas Magee, and Joseph Henri Picard were acclaimed to two-year terms on the separate school board.

There were ten aldermen on city council, but four of the positions were already filled: Joseph Adair, James Collisson, Daniel Knott, and Rice Sheppard (SS) were all elected to two-year terms in 1922 and were still in office. Kenneth Alexander Blatchford had also been elected to a two-year term in 1922, but had resigned in order to run for mayor. Accordingly, William Rea was elected to a one-year term.

There were seven trustees on the public school board, but three of the positions were already filled: W H Alexander, L T Barclay, and E T Bishop had all been elected to two-year terms in 1922 and were still in office. The same was true on the separate board, where P M Dunne, J J Murray (SS), and Joseph Gariépy were continuing.

Pursuant to a plebiscite conducted during the 1922 election, the 1923 election was the first to make use of the single transferable vote style of voting. The system ensured that both Independent (business) candidates and Labour candidates would be elected and that the most popular candidates in each slate would be elected. There was less counting of votes involved compared to previous year's election because each voter could cast just one vote in the aldermanic contest, instead of six votes each as had been the case under Plurality block voting.

Voter turnout

There were 13,016 ballots cast out of 22,077 eligible voters, for a voter turnout of 58.9%.

The number of spoiled votes was higher than any previous election but its exact number is unclear. It seems though that their presence did not have an impact on the fairness of the election.
The number of spoiled votes varied from the mayoral and the aldermanic contests. At least 1200 were spoiled in the aldermanic contest, where the number of candidates was larger than the mayoral contest. Some of the spoiled votes were ballots improperly filled out (say with an X instead of a number showing ranking), but some were declared spoiled for contests where the pertinent part of the ballot was simply left blank, such as no first-choice preference being marked for mayor or no first-choice preference was marked for alderman. The number of spoiled ballots was larger than any previous city election but due to the use of STV in the aldermanic election, the  final result in this election meant that only 3494 voters (out of 11,851) did not see their first choice elected.

Results

 bold or  indicates elected
 italics indicate incumbent
 "SS", where data is available, indicates representative for Edmonton's South Side, with a minimum South Side representation instituted after the city of Strathcona, south of the North Saskatchewan River, amalgamated into Edmonton on February 1, 1912.

Mayor

Aldermen
Six seats open.
11,851 valid votes.

Quota of votes was 1693. This number guaranteed election but it was possible to be elected with fewer. 

Two southside candidates had to be elected.

14 candidates ran for the six seats open this year.

10 counts were required to see all the seats filled under the STV/PR system in use.

As votes were transferred in the ten count, the candidates' relative po9pularity changed. Ducey and Rendall received many initial votes but did not get quota and did not get enough votes in later counts to get a seat.
Rea was third in the first count but did not receive many vote transfers and eventually was declared elected to serve one year term, the consolation prize.

As seen in the above vote tallies, the front runners in the first count were mixed, belonging to both Independent (business) and Labour slates. This was the result of single voting in a multi-member district.

East and Bury were elected on first count, receiving quota. Their surplus votes were transferred to prevent waste and to ensure rough proportionality of the election result.

The second count was the distribution of East's surplus votes. Findlay received enough vote transfers from East to achieve quota on the 2nd count.

The 3rd Count was transfer of Bury's surplus votes.
The 4th count was transfer of Findlay's surplus votes.

Then the least-popular candidates were eliminated one by one until the next seat was filled.
Lakeman, Pallot, Putnam, McBride, Saunders and McKenzie were eliminated before that happened. 

Rea achieved quota on the 10th count to take a seat. His surplus votes were not transferred because the field of candidates was such that the remaining seat would be immediately filled. 

Rea's election left only two seats empty (and four candidates still standing).

Northsiders Thomas Ducey and Rendall, and two southside candidates were left standing by this point. 

No southsiders had been elected so the two remaining seats had to be filled by southsiders.

Rendall and Ducey were eliminated, there being no northside seats left to win.

The two southside candidates (Douglas and Duggan) were allocated seats to fill the two vacancies for guaranteed southside representation, as was announced the next day.

There was no business slate per se. 

On the other hand, the Labour element of the city had put forward Labour Party candidates. But the STV election did not involve parties. Voters cast votes directly for individual candidates.

East and Findlay were newly elected Labour candidates. Rice Sheppard and Dan Knott were sitting labour councillors and had one more year in their terms so Labour, with four seats, had good representation in the 1924 city council. Through the next several city elections, held using STV, Labour maintained its grip on the four seats, a very dependable result produced by a dependable scientific method.

Public school trustees

Four seats needed to be filled in this election.

The necessary quota to win a seat was 2183 (the total of votes divided by five, plus one).

Barnes achieved this in first count to get a seat.

Enough of his surplus went to Frank Crang who thus got a seat in the second count.

Bellamy and McPherson were elected in the fifth count, held after Massey and Steer had been eliminated, their second choices being distributed.

McCreath, who had picked up many votes in the second and third counts (thus moving up from the bottom of the pack where candidates were being eliminated), was dropped off in the fifth count, leaving only two candidates left to fill the two remaining slots, thus Bellamy and McPherson were elected.

Separate (Catholic) school trustees

Robert Crossland (SS), Paul Jenvrin, Thomas Magee, and Joseph Henri Picard were acclaimed.

References

City of Edmonton: Edmonton Elections

1923
1923 elections in Canada
1923 in Alberta